The Jannarelly Design-1 is the first vehicle produced by the French-Emirati automaker Jannarelly since 2016.

Presentation
The Design-1 is a roadster with central rear mid-engine and rear-wheel drive. It is built in Dubai by the French manufacturer Jannarelly and its production is limited to 499 copies. Its design is similar to roadsters of the 1960s like the AC Cobra.

Technical characteristics 

The Design-1 rests on a tubular steel and aluminum chassis, covered with a carbon fiber and/or fiberglass body. The Jannarelly Design-1 can receive a removable hard carbon roof (painted or visible carbon) to transform the roadster into a coupe.

The 3 versions available are:
 Trackday, roadster with a simple windscreen;
 Lifestyle, roadster with windshield;
 Touring, roadster with its hardtop.

References

Roadsters
First car made by manufacturer
2010s cars
2020s cars
Cars introduced in 2016
Cars of France